Eugénio dos Santos de Carvalho (1711–1760) was a Portuguese architect and military engineer, responsible for the planning and rebuilding of Lisbon's Pombaline Lower Town after the 1755 earthquake. Among other buildings he designed the Lisbon City Hall, which was destroyed by fire in 1863. He designed the Palacio do Grilo, palace of the Lafões family in Lisbon. His austere design for apartment buildings with retail at ground floor level are considered a precursor of functionalist urbanism.

References

Portuguese architects
Military engineers
1711 births
1760 deaths